is a Japanese multinational manufacturer of motorcycles, marine products such as boats and outboard motors, and other motorized products. The company was established in 1955 upon separation from Yamaha Corporation (however, Yamaha Corporation is still the largest private company shareholder with 9.92%, as of 2019), and is headquartered in Iwata, Shizuoka, Japan. The company conducts development, production and marketing operations through 109 consolidated subsidiaries as of 2012.

Led by Genichi Kawakami, the company's founder and first president, Yamaha Motor spun off from musical instrument manufacturer Yamaha Corporation in 1955 and began production of its first product, the YA-1 125cc motorcycle. It was quickly successful and won the 3rd Mount Fuji Ascent Race in its class.

The company's products include motorcycles, scooters, motorized bicycles, boats, sail boats, personal water craft, swimming pools, utility boats, fishing boats, outboard motors, 4-wheel ATVs, recreational off-road vehicles, go-kart engines, golf carts, multi-purpose engines, electrical generators, water pumps, snowmobiles, small snow throwers, automobile engines, surface mounters, intelligent machinery, industrial-use unmanned helicopters, electrical power units for wheelchairs and helmets. The company is also involved in the import and sales of various types of products, development of tourist businesses and management of leisure, recreational facilities and related services. Yamaha's motorcycle sales are the second largest in the world and Yamaha is the world leader in water vehicle sales.

History

Parent company
Yamaha Corporation (originally known as Nippon Gakki Co.) was founded by Torakusu Yamaha in 1887 to manufacture reed organs and pianos and became the largest Japanese manufacturer of musical instruments in the early 20th Century. Yamaha was contracted to manufacture wooden and (later) metal airplane propellers by the Japanese government during World War II. The company struggled in the aftermath of the war, and in the early 1950s, chairman Genichi Kawakami decided to repurpose its underutilized war-time facilities to manufacture small motorcycles for leisure use.

Beginnings: 1955
The motorcycle division of Yamaha was spun off in 1955, being incorporated on 1 July 1955 in Japan, and was headed by Genichi Kawakami. Yamaha's initial product was a  two-cycle, single cylinder motorcycle, the YA-1, which was a copy of the German DKW RT 125. The YA-1 was a competitive success at racing from the beginning, winning not only the 125cc class in the Mt. Fuji Ascent, but also sweeping the podium with first, second and third place in the All Japan Autobike Endurance Road Race that same year.  Early success in racing set the tone for Yamaha, as competition in many varieties of motorcycle racing has been a key endeavor of the company throughout its history, often fueled by a strong rivalry with Honda, Suzuki, Kawasaki and other Japanese manufacturers.
Yamaha began competing internationally in 1956 when they entered the Catalina Grand Prix, again with the YA-1, at which they placed sixth. The YA-1 was followed by the YA-2 of 1957, another 125cc two stroke, but with significantly improved frame and suspension.  The YD-1 of 1957 was a 250cc two-stroke twin cylinder motorcycle, resembling the YA-2, but with a larger and more powerful motor.  A performance version of this bike, the YDS-1 housed the 250cc two-stroke twin in a double downtube cradle frame and offered the first five-speed transmission in a Japanese motorcycle. This period also saw Yamaha offer its first outboard marine engine.

Success and growth in the 1960s

By 1963 Yamaha's dedication to both the two-stroke engine and racing paid off with their first victory in international competition, at the Belgian GP, where they won the 250cc class.  Success in sales was even more impressive, and Yamaha set up the first of its international subsidiaries in this period beginning with Thailand in 1964, and the Netherlands in 1968.  1965 saw the release of a 305cc two-stroke twin, the flagship of the company's lineup.  It featured a separate oil supply which directly injected oil into the gasoline prior to combustion (traditionally riders had to pre-mix oil into gasoline together before filling the gas tank on two stroke engines).  In 1967 a new larger displacement model was added to the range, the 350cc two stroke twin R-1.

In 1968 Yamaha launched their first four-stroke motorcycle, the XS-1.  The Yamaha XS-1 was a 650cc four-stroke twin, a larger and more powerful machine that equaled the displacement and performance of the popular British bikes of the era, such as the Triumph Bonneville and BSA Gold Star.  Yamaha continued on with both the two-stroke line and four-stroke twins at a time that other Japanese manufacturers were increasingly moving to four cylinder four-stroke machines, a trend led by Honda in 1969 with the legendary CB-750 four-stroke four-cylinder cycle.

Two stroke era begins: the 1970s
In early 1969, Yamaha added reed-valve induction to its previously piston-ported designs to produce the twin-cylinder RD and single-cylinder RS families, with variants in a number of capacities. There was a persistent, but apocryphal, rumour to the effect that "RD" indicated race developed. In fact, "R" appears to have indicated reed valved, "D" the twin (or double) cylinder models and "S" the single-cylinder models. The RD family would be developed through the 1970s and 1980s, gaining solid wheels, water-cooling, YPVS, and other newer technology 'til they had little in common with the original variants (before being supplanted by the TZR). The RS family was produced for many years in a large number of variants by Yamaha and then Escorts Limited in India without losing its resemblance to its progenitors. In addition to the RD and RS standards, Yamaha also manufactured small standards with stamped steel frames and rotary disc-valved motors such as the Yamaha FS1, and step-through V-50 and V-80 designs. Its Enduro trail bike was replaced by the DT models. Not until 1976 would Yamaha answer the other Japanese brands with a multi-cylinder four stroke of their own. The XS-750 (and later 850) a 750cc triple cylinder machine with shaft final drive was introduced almost seven years after Honda's breakthrough bike.  Yamaha's first four-cylinder model, the XS-1100 followed in 1978, again with shaft drive.  Despite being heavier and more touring oriented than its rivals it produced an impressive string of victories in endurance racing.

The 1970s also saw some of the first dedicated off-road bikes for off-road racing and recreation.  Yamaha was an early innovator in dirt-bike technology, and introduced the first single-shock rear suspension, the trademarked "Monoshock" of 1973.  It appeared in production on the 1974 Yamaha YZ-250, a model which is still in production, making it Yamaha's longest continuous model and name.

Yamaha continued racing throughout the 1960s and 1970s with increasing success in several formats.  The decade of the 1970s was capped by the XT500 winning the first Paris-Dakar Rally in 1979.

1980s: diversification and innovation

By 1980 the combination of consumer preference and environmental regulation made four strokes increasingly popular.  Suzuki ended production of their GT two stroke series, including the flagship water-cooled two-stroke 750cc GT-750 in 1977.  Kawasaki, who had considerable success throughout the 1970s with their two-stroke triples of 250cc, 350cc, 400cc, 500cc and 750cc ended production of road-going two strokes in 1980.  Yamaha bucked this trend and continued to refine and sell two-strokes for the street into the 1980s.  These bikes were performance oriented, water-cooled twin cylinder machines, designed to achieve excellent performance taking advantage of the lower weight of two strokes. The RZ-250 of 1980 was the progenitor of this series. The RZ-350, the largest displacement model, was a popular hot-rod bike of the 1980s and continued to be sold in some countries into the early 1990s.

Throughout the 1980s the motorcycle industry gradually went from building a few basic but versatile models designed to work well in many roles, to offering many more specialized machines designed to excel in particular niches.  These included racing and performance street riding, touring, motocross racing, enduro and recreational off-road riding, and cruising.  Yamaha branched out from the relatively small number of UJMs (Universal Japanese Motorcycle) at the start of the decade to a much larger set of offerings in several clearly defined markets at the end of the decade.

The XV750 of 1981 featured an air-cooled V-twin four-stroke engine and cruiser styling, and was one of the first Japanese cruiser style motorcycles.  By the end of the 1980s Yamaha had offered dozens of cruiser styled bikes in a variety of displacements and engine configurations.

The RZV500 was one of the first "repli-racers", a near copy of Kenny Roberts competition GP bike, it featured a liquid-cooled two-stroke motor of 500cc displacement in a V4 configuration, along with a perimeter frame and full fairing.

A more popular and practical high-performance model for the street was introduced in 1985, the FZ750. It was an innovative 750cc four-stroke inline four cylinder model. It was the first motorcycle to feature a five-valve cylinder head, something Yamaha became well known for.  It also featured a cylinder block canted forward at 45 degrees, and a box-section steel perimeter frame. Production of the FZ continued until 1991.

Another bike that was performance-oriented was the Yamaha RX-Z, introduced in 1985 as a two-stroke naked sport bike, related to the Yamaha RX-135 and Yamaha RD-135, borrowing its chassis and platform. Originally equipped with a five speed transmission and a solid front disc brake rotor with rear drum brakes, it was popular in Malaysia and Singapore. After a few years on the market, the engine was upgraded with the installation of a six-speed transmission, together with a newer instrument panel and handlebar switches, as well as a cross-drilled front disc brake rotor, while the rear remained with the drum brakes. The design was unchanged until it was updated in 2004, with the rear lights being borrowed by the Yamaha Y125Z and a new headlight. It was also installed with a catalytic converter, which reduced its horsepower to 19bhp. However, the maximum torque remained unchanged but the low-end torque was improved compared to the early models. Some owners of the earlier RX-Z motorcycles may have problems during take-off because the engine tends to stall when an inexperienced rider tries to take off in the first gear. However, the problem was resolved in the new model. In Malaysia, this bike was associated with street racers and was featured in many Malay movies. In 2011, after 26 years, it was discontinued.

The 1990s: Performance bikes and a spin-off brand

In 1998 Yamaha marketed a 1000cc four cylinder road bike called the YZF 'R1', this model introduced a new style of gearbox design which shortened the overall length of the motor/gearbox case, to allow a more compact unit. This, in turn allowed the motor to be placed in the frame further forward, designed to improve handling in a short wheel-based frame.

In 1995, Yamaha announced the creation of Star Motorcycles, a new brand name for its cruiser series of motorcycles in the American market. In other markets, Star motorcycles are still sold under the Yamaha brand.  This was an attempt to create a brand identity more closely aligned with the cruiser market segment, one of the largest and most lucrative in the USA.

The 2000s: Expansion and consolidation

In 2007, Yamaha established the Philippine operations and distributes Yamaha motorcycles under the corporate name of Yamaha Motor Philippines, Inc., one of more than 20 worldwide subsidiaries operating on all continents.

Yamaha purchased small engine maker Subaru Industrial Power Products from Subaru in October 2017. Subaru's engines powered lawnmowers, generators and water pumps and have since been rebranded as Yamaha.

Motorcycle racing highlights

In motorcycle racing Yamaha has won 39 world championships, including seven in MotoGP and 10 in the preceding 500 cc two-stroke class, and two in World Superbike. In addition Yamaha have recorded 210 victories at the Isle of Man TT and head the list of victories at the Sidecar TT with 40. Past Yamaha riders include: Jarno Saarinen Giacomo Agostini, Bob Hannah, Heikki Mikkola, Bruce Anstey, Kenny Roberts, Eddie Lawson, Wayne Rainey, Jeremy McGrath, Stefan Merriman, Dave Molyneux, Ian Hutchinson, Phil Read, Chad Reed, Ben Spies, Jorge Lorenzo, and nine-time world champion Valentino Rossi.

The Yamaha YZ450F won the AMA Supercross Championship two years in a row, in 2008 with Chad Reed, and 2009 James Stewart. Yamaha was the first to build a production monoshock motocross bike (1975 for 250 and 400, 1976 for 125) and one of the first to have a water-cooled motocross production bike (1977 in works bikes, 1981 in off-the-shelf bikes). Yamaha's first Motocross competition four-stroke bike, the YZ400F, won the 1998 USA outdoor national Championship with factory rider Doug Henry.

Since 1962, Yamaha made production road racing Grand Prix motorcycles that any licensed road racer could purchase. In 1970, non-factory privateer teams dominated the 250 cc World Championship with Great Britain's Rodney Gould winning the title on a Yamaha TD2.

Yamaha also sponsors several professional ATV riders in several areas of racing, such as cross country racing and motocross. Yamaha has had success in cross country with their YFZ450, ridden by Bill Ballance, winning 9 straight titles since 2000. Yamaha's other major rider, Traci Cecco, has ridden the YFZ450 to 7 titles, with the first in 2000. In ATV motocross, Yamaha has had success with Dustin Nelson and Pat Brown, both who race the YFZ450. Pat Brown's best season was a 3rd place title in 2007, while Nelson has had two 1st place titles in the Yamaha/ITP Quadcross, one in 2006 and the other in 2008.

In 2021, Yamaha has won several competitions, such as British Superbike with Tarran Mackenzie, MotoAmerica with Jake Gagne, MFJ Superbike with Katsuyuki Nakasuga, WorldSSP with Dominique Aegerter, and several other competitions.

Their 2022 MotoGP lineup consists of Fabio Quartararo and Franco Morbidelli, with Toprak Razgatlıoğlu and Andrea Locatelli in World Superbikes. Yamaha's Superbike World Championship team since 2016 has been delivered by Crescent Racing.

World Superbike

The first Yamaha rider to ever win a World Superbike was Ben Spies in 2009. Then in 2021, Toprak Razgatlıoğlu managed to become world champion.

By season results

(key) (Races in bold indicate pole position; races in italics indicate fastest lap)

* Season still in progress.

Formula One 

Yamaha produced Formula One engines from 1989 to 1997 (with a one-year break in 1990), initially for the Zakspeed team, in 1991 for the Brabham BT60Y, in 1992 for the Jordan 192, from 1993 to 1996 for Tyrrell, and in 1997 for the Arrows A18. The Yamaha Engines never won a race (Damon Hill nearly did so at the 1997 Hungarian Grand Prix), drivers including Damon Hill, Ukyo Katayama, Mark Blundell and Mika Salo scored some acceptable results with Blundell achieving a surprise 3rd place at the 1994 Spanish Grand Prix and Hill with 2nd at the aforementioned 1997 Hungarian Grand Prix, this partly was considered to be due to Yamaha collaborating with the John Judd Engine Organization to create a better and reliable engine however there were questions raised as to whether the Yamaha Engines used from 1993 until 1997 were just Judd engines with the Yamaha branding on top of this.

1994 was considered to be Yamaha's most successful year in terms of points accrued, apart from the Podium achieved by Blundell in Spain the Yamaha engine in the Tyrrell Car achieved 4 Fifth Place finishes  and 1 Sixth Place finish over the course of the season, However, due to the inconsistency of the engine over the years they were often unreliable and were usually regarded as not very powerful, the Yamaha powered engine never secured a Fastest Lap or Pole Position despite being on the grid for nearly a decade.

After the conclusion of the 1997 Formula One Season, Yamaha decided to pull out of the sport, a possible reason for this was due to a disagreement with Arrows regarding the 1998 engine's identification, Yamaha wished to carry out work on the engine with their engineers while Arrows wished for their own engineers to work on the engine instead while still having it badged as a Yamaha engine.

Formula One World Championship results

(key)

Products

Overview 
Yamaha Motor is a highly diversified company which produces products for a large number of industries and consumer market segments:

 Motorcycles: Sport bikes, Star Cruiser bikes, trail bikes, road racers and motocross racers

All terrain vehicles

Snowmobiles
 Commuter vehicles, including scooters
 Boats: Powerboats, sailboats (e.g. Yamaha 26, a sailboat produced in the 1970s), utility boats and custom boats
 Marine engines: Outboard motors, electric marine motors, marine diesel engines and stern drives
 Personal watercraft – see WaveRunner
 Electric bicycles
 Automobile engines
 Industrial-use unmanned helicopters
 Golf cars
 Power products: generators, multipurpose engines, water pumps and snow throwers
 Swimming pools, watersliders and pool-related equipment
 Intelligent machinery, including compact industrial robots
 Electric wheelchairs and wheelchair electric drive units
 Yamaha parts and accessories, apparel, cycle helmets and motor oil
 Industrial robots and surface mounters

Automobile engines

Yamaha has built engines for other manufacturers' vehicles beginning with the development and production of the Toyota 2000GT (1967). The cylinder head from the Toyota 4A-GE engine was developed by Yamaha and built at Toyota's Shimayama plant alongside the 4A and 2A engines.

In 1984, executives of the Yamaha Motor Corporation signed a contract with the Ford Motor Company to develop, produce, and supply compact 60° 3.0 Liter DOHC V6 engines for transverse application for the 1989–95 Ford Taurus SHO. From 1993 to 1995, the SHO engine was produced in 3.0 and 3.2 Liter versions. Yamaha jointly designed the 3.4 Liter DOHC V-8 engine with Ford for the 1996–99 SHO. Ford and Yamaha also developed the Zetec-SE branded 4-cylinder engines used in several Ford cars like the small sports car Ford Puma.

From 2005 to 2010, Yamaha produced a 4.4 Litre V8 for Volvo. The B8444S engines were used in the XC90 and S80 models, whilst also adapted to 5.0L configuration for Volvo's foray into the V8 Supercars with the S60. British sportscar maker Noble also uses a bi-turbo version of the Volvo V8 in their M600.

All performance-oriented cylinder heads on Toyota/Lexus engines were designed and/or built by Yamaha. Some examples are the 1LR-GUE engine found on the 2010–2012 Lexus LFA, the 2UR-GSE found in Lexus ISF, the 3S-GTE engine found on the Toyota MR2 and Toyota Celica GT4/All-Trac, the 2ZZ-GE engine found on the 1999–2006 Toyota Celica GT-S and Lotus Elise Series 2, and the Toyota 4GR-FSE engine found on the Lexus IS250.

Yamaha also tunes engines for manufacturers, such as Toyota, so Yamaha logos are on Toyota S engines.

Yamaha also tried to produce a supercar in the 1990s, named the Yamaha OX99-11. It was made as a supercar to have a Yamaha Formula 1 engine as its powerplant and have Formula 1 technology in it. Even though their engines did not win a Grand Prix, by 1991 the team had produced a new engine, the OX99, and approached a German company to design an initial version of the car. Yamaha was not pleased with the result as it was too similar to sport cars of that time, so it contacted IAD to continue working on the project. By the beginning of 1992, just under 12 months after starting to work on the project, IAD came with an initial version of the car. The car's design was undertaken by Takuya Yura, and was originally conceived as a single seater; however, Yamaha requested a two-seater vehicle and a tandem seating arrangement was suggested which was in keeping with Yamaha's motorcycle expertise. This resulted in a radical and somewhat outrageous design based on Group C cars of the time, with features such as the cockpit-locking roof. It also shared the same chassis as the Formula 1 car, to try to give the consumer market a pure Formula 1 experience. Eventually disagreements with IAD over the budget made Yamaha take the project to its own Ypsilon Technology which was given six months to finish the project, otherwise it would be terminated. To make matters worse, Japan was in the midst of an economic downturn, which made Yamaha believe there would be no customers for the car, and so the project was cancelled in 1994 after many delays, with only 3 prototypes in existence.

References

External links

 

Moped manufacturers
Motor
Motorcycle manufacturers of Japan
Scooter manufacturers
Boat builders
Engine manufacturers of Japan
Motor vehicle manufacturers of Japan
Marine engine manufacturers
Motor vehicle engine manufacturers
Snowmobile manufacturers
Defense companies of Japan
Robotics companies of Japan
Unmanned aerial vehicle manufacturers
Companies based in Shizuoka Prefecture
Vehicle manufacturing companies established in 1955
Formula One engine manufacturers
Cycle manufacturers of Japan
Companies listed on the Tokyo Stock Exchange
Japanese companies established in 1955
1960s initial public offerings
Motorcycle engine manufacturers
Personal water craft manufacturers
Electric motor manufacturers
Iwata, Shizuoka